In Islam, khums (literally 'one fifth') refers to the required religious obligation of any Muslims to pay 20% of their acquired wealth from certain sources toward specified causes. It is treated differently in Shia and Sunni Islam. This tax is paid to the imam, caliph or sultan, representing the state of Islam, for distribution between the orphans, the needy, the [stranded] traveler, and the descendants of Islamic prophet Muhammad.  In some jurisdictions, khums is paid on minerals extracted in regions under the control of the state. Khums  separate from other Islamic taxes such as zakat and jizya.

In Sunni Islam, the scope of khums tax has been the spoils of war. In Shia Islam, the scope of khums tax includes spoils of war, objects obtained from the sea (al-ghaws), treasure (al-kanz), mineral resources (al-ma'adin), business profits (arbaah al-makaasib), lawful (al-halaal) gain which has become mixed with unlawful (al-haraam), and the sale of land to a dhimmi.

Etymology
The Arabic term khums literally means one-fifth. It is referred to as "Earnings,Profits,property holdings,savings " based on the Quran and various Hadiths. In other words, Khums and ghanima are revealed in the Quran.

Concept
Khums means "one-fifth or 20%". In Islamic legal terminology, it means one-fifth of certain items that a person acquires as wealth must be paid to the state of Islam. This is one of many forms of tax in Islamic jurisprudence that applies on ghanima and fai (or fay). In the early and middle history of Islam, ghanima was property and wealth that was looted by the Muslim army after attacking the unbelievers. Fai was that property and wealth that was gained from confiscation without strife, that is if the unbelievers refused to fight or violently opposed the raid. Over time, the concept and scope of ghanima was expanded by Islamic scholars, and variations emerged between Sunni and Shia scholars over interpreting the definition of ghanima. Similarly, the percentage of fai was expanded to 100% using verse 59.7 of the Quran, thus placing it beyond khums. The 80% amount left after paying the 20% khums, was distributed among the army commander and soldiers who attacked the unbelievers.

There are differences of opinion about the scope of khums in Sunni and Shia sects of Islam, as well as who owns it and how the collected khums should be spent.

Islamic scriptures
This teaching is repeated in Sahih Hadith. According to Sahih al-Bukhari, when the delegates of the tribe of 'Abdul-Qais met the  prophet and asked him some advice, he told them to pay  "Khums (i.e. one-fifth) of the war booty to Allah".
As mentioned in Sahih Muslim, since the prophet appointed someone as a leader, he recommended some principals such as "Fight in the name of Allah and in the way of Allah. Fight against those who disbelieve in Allah. Make a holy war, do not embezzle the spoils [of war, booty]".  

Through a lengthy Hadith recorded in Kitab al-Kafi (a Shia reference), the Prophet Muhammad has mentioned that those entitled to receive Al-Khums are the relatives of the Holy Prophet whom Allah has mentioned in his words, "Warn your close relatives. They are the children of Abdul-Muttalib, men and women. None of the families of Quraysh or the Arabs or their slaves are lawful to receive al-Khums. The charities of the masses of people are lawful for their slaves to consume. One whose mother is from the family of Banu Hashim and his father from the masses of people, the charities are lawful for such person to consume. Such a person is not entitled to receive from al-Khums because Allah, the Most High has said, 'Call them sons of their own fathers'."

Shia jurisprudence (Ja'fari)
Khums, in the Ja'fari Shia tradition, is applied to the business profit, or surplus, of a business income. It is payable at the beginning of the financial year, though this is regarded as being the time at which the amount becomes clear. Ghanima and one-fifth tax of khums applies wherever gain or profit is involved. "Ghanima" has two meanings as mentioned above; the second meaning is illustrated by the common use of the Islamic banking term "al-ghunm bil-ghurm" meaning "gains accompany liability for loss or risk"

In 13th century Shia religion, the khums was divided into two portions. One portion went to the descendants of Muhammad, the other portion was divided equally with one part given to Imam and clergy, while the other part went to the orphaned and poor Muslims. 
The famous view of contemporary Faqihs is that the Imam's portion (during the Occultation (Islam)) is used in the fields that the Marja' Taqlid has outlined. The Imam would use it in those ways, such as reinforcing Islam and Seminary, promotion of Islam, building mosques in necessary situations, libraries and schools' affairs, assisting old people, and actually all blessing affairs in the order of their priority and their religious significance. Khums became a major source of income and financial independence for the clergy in Shia regions. This practice has continued among Shia Muslims.

It is narrated in Kitab al-Kafi that Imam Musa al-Kadhim would accept one dirham from the people, although he was one of the wealthiest in the city of Medina, to purify them. He compares this to Allah asking His creatures to lend to Him from their property, not because He is need, but rather it is His right as appointed guardian over His creatures.

Sunni jurisprudence
Scholars of the four Sunni Schools of fiqh—Hanafi, Maliki, Shafi‘i and Hanbali—have historically considered khums' 20% tax to be applicable on ghanayam (property, movable and immovable) booty seized in any raid or as a result of actual warfare, as well as buried treasure or resources extracted from land, sea, or mines. Others, such as Abu Ubayd and Qardawi, say the khums applies to any windfall for Muslims, but not to income as is the case according to Shia scholars.

Hanafi
The 8th century Hanafi scholar Abu Yusuf stated, according to Abdulaziz Sachedina, that the khums collected was historically distributed into three equal portions: one for Muhammad, which went to the caliph (or sultan) after Muhammad's death; the second portion to the family of Muhammad; and the third portion shared among Muslim orphans, the poor, and wayfarers. Abu Hanifa stated that the portion meant for Muhammad and his family should be used instead for amassing weapons and growing the Muslim army for further raids and wars against unbelievers. Al-Shaybani interpreted Abu Hanifa to be suggesting that the collected khums tax should be spent equally on Muslim orphans, the poor and warfarers.

Maliki
Malik ibn Anas, the founder of the Maliki sect of Sunni Islam, stated that the right to spend the khums belonged to the caliph (Imam) after the death of Muhammad, and he had freedom to dispose of the 20% khums tax collected from war booty between the poor and the rich as he wishes, and that he may, if he desired, give any part of the khums tax to Muhammad's family.

Shafi'i
Al-Shafi‘i, the founder of the Shafii madhhab (school of thought) of Sunni Islam, provided two scenarios on how 20% khums tax on seized raid and war booty was to be spent. He explained that during the time Muhammad was alive, khums was divided into five portions, the first portion was for Allah and his messenger and given to Muhammad, the second portion was for Muhammad's family members, the remaining three to the Muslim poor, orphans and wayfarers. After Muhammad's death, the khums tax was divided into four portions, one for the family of Muhammad, and the other three for the general good of all Muslims.

Most Muslim scholars after Al-Shafi'i agreed that a portion of the 20% khums tax should go to the descendants of Muhammad, but they disagreed on who these rightful descendants were. These Islamic scholars also concurred that khums tax should be spent, among other things, to maintain the Muslim army and for the general good of the Muslims.

Types
According to medieval Shia Muslim scholars Al-Tusi and Al-Hakim, seven items were subject to khums 20% tax:
Al-ghanima, booty seized during a raid and the spoils of war.
Arbdh al-mdkasib, the profit or the surplus of the income.
Al-hardm, Al-haldl, the legitimately earned wealth which has become mixed with illegitimate wealth.
Al-madin, mines and mineral resources extracted anywhere within the Islamic state. 
Al-ghaws, objects obtained from sea.
Al-kanz, treasure found.
The land which is transferred to a non-Muslim dhimmi when the latter buys it from a Muslim, and which was previously acquired by the Islamic state by a treaty of surrender by the dhimmis.

Sunni scholars have confined the khums 20% tax to apply on only two items,
Al-ghanima, يعني المصطلح العربي خُمس حرفياً الخمس.  ويشار إليها باسم "الأرباح ، وحيازات الممتلكات ، والأرباح ، والمدخرات" استناداً إلى القرآن والأحاديث المختلفة.  وبعبارة أخرى ، فإن القرآن والخمس يظهران في القرآن
Al-madin, mines and mineral resources extracted anywhere within the Islamic state.

The Arabic word ghanima  has been interpreted to have several meanings:
spoils of war, or war booty looted or confiscated from enemy / nonbelievers (of Islam)
profit
minerals or any other form of buried treasure

After paying the 20% khums tax, the remaining 80% of the booty seized, spoils of war and treasure found was distributed among the commanders and soldiers as a reward for their effort, participating in the raid, or going to war against non-Muslims. The origins of the khums, states Abdulaziz Sachedina, go back to "the pre-Islamic Arab custom wherein the chief was entitled to one fifth of the ghanima (booty) in addition to the safw al-ndl (the portion of the booty which especially attracted him). The remainder of the booty was normally divided among the raiders who had accompanied the chief, but the latter reserved the right to dispose of the ghanima as he chose".

Distribution
As the Quran mentions, khums should be paid to: 
Allah: the share of Allah is devoted to the Prophet but some Sunni scholars believe that it should be devoted to the Prophet's relatives or Muslims in general
The Messenger of Allah: the Shia considered it should be paid to the prophet's successor, after his death
The near relative of the Messenger who the Shia know as Imam
The orphans
The needy
Stranded travelers

There are no major different views between Shia and Sunni scholars on how to distribute Khums.

Khums in history

Africa
Khums was practiced by Muslim commanders who raided African communities from the 8th century through the early 20th century. However, khums was treated as a concept and the share of booty transferred to the Islamic state was 50%. For example, in 1919, the West African Muslim ruler Hamman Yaji recorded the following in his diary,

Similarly, from 8th to 10th century, the Berber people in North Africa were treated as pagans, raided and the booty of seized wealth and slaves were subject to khums.

Europe
From the 8th century onwards, Southern Europe became a target of raids and military campaigns from Morocco and by the Ottoman Sultanate. After the conquest of Cordoba by Muslim armies, khums (20%) of all moveable booty seized from Christians and Jews after the war was transferred to the caliphal treasury, the rest was distributed among the commanders and Muslim soldiers of the invading army. According to Musa Nusayr, the army commanders also set aside 20% of land vacated by non-Muslims to the caliph. The land that was surrendered by Christians and Jews, but not vacated, became subject to jizya payable by the dhimmis. However, Ibn Hazm states that Muslim soldiers did not set aside or pay khums from the looted property or riches from the annexed land, each kept the spoils for himself. This became one source of distrust and dispute between the Muslim rulers and clergy based in Africa and the new Caliphate of Cordoba in Southwestern Europe. Outside Spain, Ghanima and Fay were sought from Muslim conquests in Sicily, Greece and Caucasian region of Europe. Khums was paid from all seized movable property to the caliphal treasury.

India
From the 10th century through the 18th century, Muslim armies raided non-Muslim kingdoms of India. Some of these Muslim armies came from the northwest, consisting of Turko-Mongols, Persians and Afghans. In other times, these were commanders of Delhi Sultanate. War spoils and looted movable property from infidels (Hindus, Jains, Buddhists) was subject to khums. The 20% tax was transferred to the treasury of the sultanate, and the 80% was distributed among the commanders, mounted soldiers and foot soldiers. The mounted soldiers were given two to three times as much of the war booty as the foot soldiers. The collected war booty from the treasuries and temples of Hindus were an incentive for war, and the Khums (Ghanima tax) was a source of wealth for the sultans in India. One batch of loot was from Warangal, and it included the Koh-i-Noor, one of the largest known diamonds in human history.

See also
Zakat
Qard al-Hassan
Jizya
Kharaj
Nisab
Dhimmi
List of battles of Muhammad
Criticism of Twelver Shia Islam

Notes

References

External links

 Muḥammad ibn al-Ḥasan Ṭūsī, Sections 12 and 13, pages 149-151; 11th Century Shia views on Khums, Ghana'im and Anfal
 Abdulaziz Sachedina, Journal of Near Eastern Studies, Vol. 39, No. 4 (Oct., 1980), pp. 275–289; Al-Khums: The Fifth in the Imāmī Shīʿī Legal System
Khums, An Islamic Tax

Shia Islam
Islamic worship
Taxation in Islam
Islamic terminology
Arabic words and phrases in Sharia
Sharia legal terminology